The men's 4 × 100 metres relay was held on 9 and 10 September 1972.

Heats
The top four teams in each of the four heats advanced to the semifinal round.
Heat one

Heat two

Heat three

Heat four

Semifinals
The top four teams in each of the two heats advanced to the final.

Heat one

Heat two

Final

References

External links
Official report

Athletics at the 1972 Summer Olympics
Relay foot races at the Olympics
Men's events at the 1972 Summer Olympics